The 2010 NCAA Division III women's basketball tournament was the 29th annual tournament hosted by the NCAA to determine the national champion of Division III women's collegiate basketball in the United States.

Washington University in St. Louis defeated Hope College in the championship game, 65–59, to claim the Bears' fifth Division III national title.

The championship rounds were hosted by Illinois Wesleyan University at the Shirk Center in Bloomington, Illinois.

Bracket

Final Four

All-tournament team
 Jaimie McFarlin, Washington University in St. Louis
 Zoë Unruh, Washington University in St. Louis
 Carrie Snikkers, Hope
 Sarah Leyman, Amherst
 Melissa Alwardt, Rochester

See also
 2010 NCAA Division I women's basketball tournament
 2010 NCAA Division II women's basketball tournament
 2010 NAIA Division I women's basketball tournament
 2010 NAIA Division II women's basketball tournament
 2010 NCAA Division III men's basketball tournament

References

 
NCAA Division III women's basketball tournament
2010 in sports in Illinois
Washington University Bears
Hope Flying Dutchmen